Elk Lick or Elklick may refer to:

Elk Lick, Ohio
Elk Lick Township, Somerset County, Pennsylvania
Elk Lick Lodge
Elklick Woodlands Natural Area Preserve